Edgar Thomas Wainwright was a sculptor born in Glasgow, Scotland in 1868. He moved to New York City in 1889 and to New Orleans in 1897. He was an accomplished artist and sculptor, although he apprenticed under the tutelage of various American sculptors after landing in New York at the age of 21. He learned the art of bronze sand casting at this young age. Because of this early first hand knowledge of foundry techniques, his bronze sculptures show a very high degree of detail, workmanship, and finish to them. He was especially known for bronze relief work, and held commissions for local churches in New Orleans. In about 1900, Wainwright decided to end his short career as a sculptor.

References

Scottish sculptors
Artists from Glasgow
Year of death missing
1868 births